Petar Brlek (born 29 January 1994) is a Croatian professional footballer who plays as a midfielder for NK Osijek.

Club career
On 27 February 2016, Brlek signed three and a half years contract with Polish side Wisła Kraków.

On 24 August 2017, he joined Serie A side Genoa. However, after playing only five matches with the Italian club, on 27 February 2018, he was loaned to his former club Wisła Kraków.

On 31 July 2019, Brlek joined Ascoli on loan until 30 June 2020 with an option to buy.

Personal life
On 2 October 2020 he tested positive for COVID-19.

Career statistics

References

External links

Petar Brlek at Sportnet.hr 

1994 births
Living people
Sportspeople from Varaždin
Association football midfielders
Croatian footballers
Croatia youth international footballers
Croatia under-21 international footballers
NK Slaven Belupo players
Wisła Kraków players
Genoa C.F.C. players
FC Lugano players
Ascoli Calcio 1898 F.C. players
NK Osijek players
Croatian Football League players
Ekstraklasa players
Serie A players
Serie B players
Swiss Super League players
First Football League (Croatia) players
Croatian expatriate footballers
Expatriate footballers in Poland
Croatian expatriate sportspeople in Poland
Expatriate footballers in Italy
Croatian expatriate sportspeople in Italy
Expatriate footballers in Switzerland
Croatian expatriate sportspeople in Switzerland